Francis X. Pavy (born March 2, 1954) is a Cajun American painter and sculptor. His work has been exhibited in New York City, New Orleans, Louisiana, Houston, Texas, Los Angeles, California, France, and Switzerland.

Early life
Pavy was born in Lafayette, Louisiana on March 2, 1954. In his youth, he studied under the visual artist Elemore Morgan, Jr. He attended the University of Southwestern Louisiana, where he studied music, ceramics, animation, painting, printmaking and sculpture. In 1976, he graduated with a Bachelor of Fine Arts degree in sculpture.

Art
Pavy's art is strongly influenced by his Cajun heritage and the mythology and storytelling of the Southern U.S. His work features recognizable Louisianan archetypes, such as zydeco instruments and rural Southern architecture—art critic Calvin Harland described him as "one of the very few artists of a...Cajun Heritage to have made in-depth use of his native source material." He melds these archetypes with sophisticated patterning for a psychedelic effect.

Pavy paints on canvas and paper. He also paints on "constructions," simple sculptures of wood, plastic, and found objects that give his paintings three-dimensionality.

In Spring 2011, the Acadiana Center for the Arts in Lafayette, Louisiana honored Pavy with a retrospective of his 35-year career.

Trivia
Lorne Michaels owns a print of Pavy's painting, Zydeco Blues, and hangs it in his office. As a result, the print can frequently be seen on Saturday Night Live.

References

External links
Francis X Pavy official Web site

People from Lafayette, Louisiana
Living people
20th-century American painters
American male painters
21st-century American painters
21st-century American male artists
Painters from Louisiana
1954 births
20th-century American sculptors
20th-century American male artists
21st-century American sculptors
American male sculptors
University of Louisiana at Lafayette alumni
Sculptors from Louisiana